Belmont Hotel is a historic hotel building located at Belmont in Allegany County, New York. The three story brick building was constructed in 1890 to plans by Fredonia architects Curtis & Archer. The first floor features cast iron storefronts and arcaded loggia. Located adjacent to the Allegany County Courthouse, the hotel played an important role in the county's social, business, and political affairs.

It was listed on the National Register of Historic Places on December 3, 2001.

References

Hotel buildings on the National Register of Historic Places in New York (state)
Hotel buildings completed in 1890
Buildings and structures in Allegany County, New York
National Register of Historic Places in Allegany County, New York